Basil Samuel Feldman, Baron Feldman (23 September 1923 – 19 November 2019) was a British businessman who was a Conservative member of the House of Lords. He sat in the House from 1996 until his retirement in 2017.

Biography 
Feldman was born in September 1923 to Tilly (née Katz; 1902–1977) and Philip Feldman, and was educated at the Grocers' School. Feldman began his first business in 1946, with Richard Beecham. Feldman was a former member of Lloyd's of London, and was the director of The Young Entrepreneurs Fund from 1985 to 1994. He has been described as a former plastic-toy magnate whose business interests reportedly included "Sindy dolls, aircraft kits and yo-yos". Feldman married his wife Gita Julius in 1952. His younger sister was Fenella Fielding, the actress. He had two sons and a daughter. One of his sons is Nick Feldman, bass guitarist of the band Wang Chung. Feldman was a member of the Garrick and Carlton Clubs.

He was knighted in 1982. On 15 January 1996 he was made a life peer as Baron Feldman, of Frognal in the London Borough of Camden. His sponsors were Margaret Thatcher and Cecil Parkinson, and he was introduced to the House of Lords on 14 February 1996.

Feldman died in November 2019 at the age of 96.

Arms

References

External links
 Lord Feldman—biography, www.parliament.uk

1923 births
2019 deaths
Conservative Party (UK) life peers
English Jews
Jewish British politicians
Knights Bachelor
People educated at Hackney Downs School
20th-century British businesspeople
Life peers created by Elizabeth II